Helen Brown may refer to:

Helen Agcaoili Summers Brown (1915–2011), Filipino-American teacher, librarian, and founder of the Pilipino American Reading Room and Library
Helen Brown (artist) (1917–1986), New Zealand artist
Helen Brown (author) (born 1954), New Zealand author
Helen Evans Brown (1904–1964), American food writer and cookbook author
Helen Gurley Brown (1922–2012), American author, publisher, and businesswoman
Helen Hayes (née Brown, 1900–1993), American actress
Helen Jean Brown (1903–1982), American botanist and phycologist
Helen Lawrenson (1907–1982), American writer, born Helen Strough Brown
Helen McElhone, née Brown (1933–2013), Scottish politician
Helen Paxton Brown (1876–1956), Scottish artist
Helen Shaw (politician) (c. 1879–1964), Scottish politician, born Helen Brown Shaw
Phyllis Fraser (1916–2006), American actress, journalist, and children's book publisher, born Helen Brown Nichols